Bhagwant Nagar is a town, Vidhan Sabha seat and a nagar panchayat in Unnao district in the state of Uttar Pradesh, India.

Demographics
 India census, Bhagwant Nagar had a population of 30,000. Males constitute 53% of the population and females 47%. Bhagwant Nagar has an average literacy rate of 58%, lower than the national average of 59.5%; with 60% of the males and  40% of the females literate. 14% of the population is under 6 years of age.

References

Cities and towns in Unnao district